The 2014–15 Northern Ireland Football League was the second season of Northern Ireland's national football league running independently as the Northern Ireland Football League, consisting of the top three levels of the national league system, namely: the Premiership, Championship 1, and Championship 2. It was the 114th season of Irish league football overall. The season began on 8 August 2014 and concluded on 2 May 2015.

Cliftonville were the defending champions, after they won a second consecutive title the previous season for the first time in the club's history - their fourth outright league title and fifth overall. Ten years after suffering relegation to the second tier in 2004–05 and just eight years after their return to the top flight in 2006–07, Crusaders were this season's champions. They lifted the title for the fifth time overall on 18 April 2015 – their first top flight title in the 18 years since their last win in the 1996–97 season.

For the second successive season, a club was relegated to regional football. Ballymoney United finished bottom of Championship 2 and were relegated to a regional division for the following season.

Promotion and relegation
Promoted from Championship 1 to the Premiership
 Institute (1st in NIFL Championship 1)

Relegated from the Premiership to Championship 1
 Ards (12th in NIFL Premiership)

Promoted from Championship 2 to Championship 1
 Armagh City (1st in Championship 2)
 PSNI (2nd in Championship 2)

Relegated from Championship 1 to Championship 2
 Coagh United (13th in Championship 1)
 Limavady United (14th in Championship 1)

Promoted from Mid-Ulster Football League to Championship 2
 Dollingstown (1st in MUFL Intermediate A Division - promoted via play-off)

Relegated from Championship 2 to Ballymena & Provincial League
 Chimney Corner (14th in Championship 2 – club resigned)
 Killymoon Rangers (16th in Championship 2)

League tables

Premiership

Championship 1

Championship 2

Results

Premiership

Championship 1

Championship 2

References

External links
Northern Ireland Football League website
BBC Sport

2014-15
0